Trehörningen is a lake in Huddinge Municipality in Södermanland, which is part of Tyresån's main catchment area. The lake is dewatered by the watercourse Lissmaån.

Trehörningen is located in Hanveden and Paradise Nature Reserve.  The lake is the highest Tyresån lake system and is also the southernmost lake in that system.

The area around the lake consists largely of rocky fields with pine-dominated forest. The area is part of Paradise's nature reserve.

Lakes of Stockholm County